XHMDR-FM is a radio station in Ciudad Madero, Tamaulipas. It is an owned-and-operated station of Grupo Imagen and carries its Imagen Radio news/talk programming.

History
XHMDR received its concession on October 2, 1990. It was owned by Enrique Regules Uriegas for Multimedios Radio. Imagen acquired XHMDR in 2006.

References

Radio stations in Tampico
Grupo Imagen